Johanna Constantine may refer to:

 Johanna Constantine (comics), a fictional character from The Sandman comics by Neil Gaiman
 Johanna Constantine, a member of the Blacklips theatre group